Peter Andrew Saville  (born 9 October 1955) is an English art director and graphic designer. He designed many record sleeves for Factory Records, which he co-founded in 1978 alongside Tony Wilson and Alan Erasmus.

Early life

Peter Saville was born in Manchester, Lancashire, and attended St Ambrose College. He studied graphic design at Manchester Polytechnic from 1975 to 1978.

Saville became involved in the music scene after meeting Tony Wilson, the journalist and broadcaster. The meeting resulted in Wilson commissioning the first Factory poster (FAC 1). Saville was a partner in Factory Records along with Wilson, Martin Hannett, Rob Gretton and Alan Erasmus.

Factory Records
Peter Saville designed many record sleeves for Factory artists, most notably for Joy Division and New Order.

Influenced by fellow student Malcolm Garrett, who had begun designing for the Manchester punk group, Buzzcocks and by Herbert Spencer's Pioneers of Modern Typography, Saville was inspired by Jan Tschichold, chief propagandist for the New Typography. According to Saville: "Malcolm had a copy of Herbert Spencer's Pioneers of Modern Typography. The one chapter that he hadn't reinterpreted in his own work was the cool, disciplined "New Typography" of Tschichold and its subtlety appealed to me. I found a parallel in it for the New Wave that was evolving out of Punk."

Saville collaborated with Ben Kelly on numerous projects during this period. Saville credited Kelly as a major influence on his work, saying "I thought I could just take things from Ben, like he was a reference book or something. He used to get really mad about it." Kelly and Saville won a Designers and Art Directors Award for the sleeve of Orchestral Manoeuvres in the Dark's 1980 self-titled first album.

Saville's album design for Joy Division's last album, Closer, released shortly after Ian Curtis' suicide in May 1980, was controversial in its depiction of Christ's body entombed. However, the design pre-dated Curtis's death, which the magazine New Musical Express confirmed, since it had been displaying proofs of the artwork in its offices for several months.

Saville's output from this period included re-appropriation from the canon of art and design. Design critic Alice Twemlow wrote: "... in the 1980s ... he would directly and irreverently "lift" an image from one genre—art history for example—and recontextualise it in another. A Fantin-Latour "Roses" painting in combination with a colour-coded alphabet became the seminal album cover for New Order's Power, Corruption & Lies (1983), for example."

In the 2002 film 24 Hour Party People, which is based on Tony Wilson and the history of Factory Records, Saville is portrayed by actor Enzo Cilenti. His reputation for missing deadlines is comically highlighted in the film.

Non-Factory work

In 1979, Saville moved from Manchester to London and became art director of the Virgin offshoot Dindisc. He subsequently created a body of work that furthered his refined take on modernism, producing work for artists such as Roxy Music, Wham!, Orchestral Manoeuvres in the Dark, Ultravox and Peter Gabriel. During his time at Dindisc, he also designed the sleeve for Canadian band Martha and the Muffins’ album Metro Music. He was paid more to design Gabriel's 1986 album So than for any other record sleeve in his career; he received £20,000. Saville founded the design agency Peter Saville Associates (still designing primarily for musical artists and record labels), which included Brett Wickens, before he was invited to close his office in 1990 to join the partner-owned Pentagram. Saville collaborated with Transport for Greater Manchester in 2008 for the rebranding of the Metrolink tram system with a yellow and silver polka-dot scheme after a period of significant expansion had been undertaken on the network.

Work after Factory Records

In 1993 Saville left London and moved to Los Angeles, to join ad agency Frankfurt Balkind with Brett Wickens. Saville soon returned to London, however, where he asked designer Howard Wakefield to restart the design studio. For three years they worked from "The Apartment" in partnership with German advertising agency Meiré & Meiré. Saville's modernist apartment in Mayfair doubled as the London studio. (The same apartment is depicted in the record sleeve of Pulp's album This Is Hardcore.) The Apartment produced works for clients such as Mandarina Duck and Smart Car. In 1999 Saville moved to offices in Clerkenwell.

Saville grew in demand as a younger generation of people in advertising and fashion had grown up with his work for Factory Records. He reached a creative and a commercial peak with design consultancy clients such as Selfridges, EMI and Pringle. Other significant commissions came from the field of fashion. Saville's fashion clients have included Jil Sander, John Galliano, Yohji Yamamoto, Christian Dior, Stella McCartney and Calvin Klein Saville often worked in collaboration with longtime friend, fashion photographer Nick Knight. The two launched the art and fashion website SHOWstudio in November 2000. Belgian fashion designer Raf Simons was granted full access to the archives of Saville's vintage Factory projects and made a personal selection of Saville-designed works to integrate them into Raf Simons "Closer" Autumn/Winter 2003-04 collection. Raf Simons Spring/Summer 2018 collection also features a selection of archival works by Saville.

In 2004 Saville became Creative Director of the City of Manchester, playing a strategic role in the regeneration and cultural renaissance of his home city, notably defining the ethos for the Manchester International Festival.

In 2010 Saville designed the England football team home shirt.
 
Saville has three D&AD awards, is a Royal Designer for Industry and won the London Design Medal in 2013. 
 
In 2012 Saville collaborated with Dovecot Studios, Edinburgh in celebration of their centenary to create a large scale tapestry of his work After, After Monarch of the Glen. This new tapestry commission is Dovecot Studios re appropriation of Peter Saville's appropriation of Sir Peter Blake's appropriation of Sir Edwin Landseer's 1851 painting Monarch of the Glen.

In 2018, Saville redesigned the logo for British luxury fashion house Burberry, as revealed by then creative director Riccardo Tisci.

In July 2019 Saville was featured in the BBC Radio 4 programme Only Artists in conversation with industrial designer Marek Reichman.

Saville was appointed Commander of the Order of the British Empire (CBE) in the 2020 New Year Honours for services to design.

Exhibition, book and soundtrack
Saville's reclaimed status and contribution to graphic design were firmly established when London's Design Museum exhibited his body of work in 2003. The exhibition, The Peter Saville Show, was open from 23 May through 14 September 2003. A book published by Frieze, Designed by Peter Saville, accompanied the exhibition. The Peter Saville Show Soundtrack for the exhibition was performed and recorded by New Order, and was available to early visitors to the exhibition.

Swing Project

Anna Blessmann and Peter Saville met in a gallery in Berlin in 2001 and soon began an artwork collaboration, works have been shown at Paul Stolper Gallery London, CRAC Alsace, Migros Museum Zurich, Whitechapel London and in various publications.

In 2010 they presented 'Swing Project 1' in the FRAC Champagne-Ardenne, Reims and in 2012 'Swing Project 2' at Galerie Neu, Berlin. In 2013 they participated in the Fiorucci Art Trust 'Volcano Extravaganza', Stromboli. In 2014 they exhibited 'Swing Project 3' at the Cabinet Gallery, London.

Selected record and CD covers by Saville
Joy Division – Unknown Pleasures, 1979
Joy Division – "Transmission", 1979
Joy Division – "Love Will Tear Us Apart", 1980
Joy Division – Closer, 1980
Martha and the Muffins – Metro Music, 1980
The Monochrome Set – Strange Boutique, 1980
Orchestral Manoeuvres in the Dark - Orchestral Manoeuvres in the Dark, (with interior designer Ben Kelly) February 1980 
Orchestral Manoeuvres in the Dark - Organisation, October 1980
Roxy Music – Flesh and Blood, 1980
David Byrne and Brian Eno – My Life in the Bush of Ghosts, 1981
Joy Division – Still, 1981
New Order – "Ceremony", 1981
New Order – Movement, 1981
Orchestral Manoeuvres in the Dark – Architecture & Morality, 1981
Section 25 – Always Now, 1981
Ultravox – Rage in Eden, 1981
King Crimson – Discipline, 1981
New Order – "Temptation", 1982
New Order – "Blue Monday", 1983
New Order – Power, Corruption and Lies, 1983
Orchestral Manoeuvres in the Dark – Dazzle Ships, 1983
Orchestral Manoeuvres in the Dark – Junk Culture, 1984
New Order – Low-Life, 1985
Peter Gabriel – So, 1986
Wham! – Music from the Edge of Heaven, 1986
New Order – Brotherhood, 1986
New Order – "Bizarre Love Triangle", 1986
New Order – "True Faith", 1987
New Order – Substance, 1987
Joy Division – Substance, 1988
New Order – Technique, 1989
New Order – Republic, 1993
Suede – Coming Up, 1996
New Order – Video 5 8 6, 1997
Pulp – This Is Hardcore, 1998
Gay Dad – Leisure Noise, 1999
The Other Two – Super Highways, 1999
Pulp – We Love Life, 2001
New Order – Get Ready, 2001
New Order – Waiting for the Sirens' Call, 2005
Brett Anderson – Brett Anderson, 2007
Orchestral Manoeuvres in the Dark – History of Modern, 2010
New Order – Music Complete, 2015

See also
 Pioneers of Modern Typography

References

 Designed by Peter Saville, by Rick Poynor, Frieze, 2003.
 Eye, No. 17, Vol. 5, edited by Rick Poynor, Emap Construct, London, Summer 1995
Webchat transcript, SHOWstudio, 2003
 Peter Saville Estate 1-127, by Heike Munder, JRP|Ringier, 2007.

External links
Official Peter Saville website
Peter Saville Works
Design Museum biography of Saville – includes timeline
comprehensive archive from former colleagues
Sleeve designed by Peter Saville - Japanese site
A selection of Factory designs, primarily New Order
Peter Saville @ Cerysmatic Factory
Spike Magazine Interview
Filmed interview on SHOWstudio
Video Interview on I love Design
Peter Saville Discography on Discogs

1955 births
Living people
Album-cover and concert-poster artists
Alumni of Manchester Metropolitan University
English graphic designers
Designers from Greater Manchester
People educated at St. Ambrose College
Factory Records
Commanders of the Order of the British Empire
Pentagram partners (past and present)